George Kittredge may refer to:

George W. Kittredge (1805–1881), U.S. Representative from New Hampshire
George Lyman Kittredge (1860–1941), American professor of English literature